"Animals" is a song by Canadian rock band Nickelback. It was released in November 2005 as the second American single from their fifth studio album, All the Right Reasons (2005). In Australia, the song was released as the album's fourth single in mid-2006. "Animals" reached number one on the US Billboard Mainstream Rock chart and number 27 in Australia.

Content
The song is about a man who picks up his girlfriend after he gets his driver's license back. They drive away and proceed to have sex in the car acting wild like "animals," until the girl's father catches them in the act at the end of the song.

Track listing

Charts

See also
 List of Billboard Mainstream Rock number-one songs of the 2000s

References

Nickelback songs
2005 singles
2005 songs
Roadrunner Records singles
Songs written by Chad Kroeger
Songs written by Daniel Adair
Songs written by Mike Kroeger